The 1998 European Athletics Indoor Championships were held from Friday, 27 February to Sunday, 1 March 1998 at the Palace of Luis Puig, Valencia, Spain.

Results

Men

Women

Medal table

Participating nations

 (2)
 (1)
 (9)
 (5)
 (13)
 (1)
 (12)
 (3)
 (6)
 (20)
 (4)
 (3)
 (4)
 (49)
 (2)
 (33)
 (33)
 (24)
 (10)
 (3)
 (10)
 (5)
 (22)
 (8)
 (3)
 (1)
 (20)
 (6)
 (17)
 (10)
 (17)
 (33)
 (5)
 (46)
 (16)
 (7)
 (6)
 (12)
 (3)

See also
1998 in athletics (track and field)

References

External links
Results - Athletix

 
European Athletics Indoor Championships
European Indoor
International athletics competitions hosted by Spain
Ath
February 1998 sports events in Europe
March 1998 sports events in Europe
Sports competitions in Valencia
20th century in Valencia